The 2009 CAF Champions League Final was a football tie held over two legs in November 2009 between Heartland, and TP Mazembe.

The first leg was held on 1 November and the second leg on 7 November.

Qualified teams
In the following table, finals until 1996 were in the African Cup of Champions Club era, since 1997 were in the CAF Champions League era.

Venues

Dan Anyiam Stadium
Dan Anyiam Stadium is a Nigerian multi-purpose stadium located in Owerri, Imo State. It is located in the centre of Owerri, Imo State's capital, the capital of Imo State, the stadium is named after Daniel Anyiam, vice-captain of the first Nigeria national football team.

It is used mostly for association-football matches and is the home stadium of Heartland F.C. The stadium a capacity of 10,000 people.

Frederic Kibassa Maliba Stadium
Stade Frédéric-Kibassa-Maliba, also known as Stade de la Kenya, is a multi-use stadium located in the Kenya suburb of Lubumbashi, Democratic Republic of the Congo.  It is currently used mostly for football matches. It is the current home of FC Saint Eloi Lupopo and the former home venue of TP Mazembe.  The stadium has a capacity of 35,000 people and is named after Frederic Kibassa Maliba, a former Minister of Youth and Sports.

Road to final

Format
The final was decided over two legs, with aggregate goals used to determine the winner. If the sides were level on aggregate after the second leg, the away goals rule would have been applied, and if still level, the tie would have proceeded directly to a penalty shootout (no extra time is played).

Matches

First leg

Second leg

Notes and references

External links
2009 CAF Champions League - cafonline.com

2009
Final
TP Mazembe matches
Heartland F.C. matches
International club association football competitions hosted by the Democratic Republic of the Congo